KQDI-FM (106.1 MHz, "Q106") is a radio station broadcasting an active rock format. Licensed to Highwood, Montana, the station serves the Great Falls area. KQDI-FM is currently owned by STARadio Corporation.

History
The station went on the air as KARR-FM in 1964, changing to KOPR-FM on December 15 of that year. It was acquired in 1977 by Sun River Broadcasting, owner of KQDI (1450 AM), and became easy listening KOOZ.

In 1984, the station changed to Top 40/CHR under the name "K-106" and with new KQDI-FM call letters. The change was short-lived, as KOOZ-FM returned the next year.

On January 1, 1989, the easy listening format moved to AM, and KOOZ became KQDI-FM again with a classic rock format. The very first song played was Led Zeppelin's "Rock and Roll" (been a long time since I Rock and Rolled); the DJ was Great Falls' legendary Bob Pepper.

References

External links
Q106 Online

QDI-FM
Radio stations established in 1964
Active rock radio stations in the United States
1964 establishments in Montana